Dongshi Township, also spelled Dongshih Township, is a rural township in Yunlin County, Taiwan.

Geography
It has a population total of 13,601 and an area of 48.3562 square kilometers.

Economy
The township produces chicken from its farms. It also produces radishes.

Administrative divisions
Yuemei, Fuxing, Jialong, Tungnan, Tungbei, Longtan, Chenghai, Changnan, Annan, Tongan, Simei and Xinkun Village.

References

External links

 Dongshih Township Office, Yunlin County 

Townships in Yunlin County